Felice Nicole Herrig (born September 18, 1984) is an American retired kickboxer, Muay Thai fighter, and mixed martial artist who competed in the Ultimate Fighting Championship (UFC) in the strawweight division.

Background
Herrig was born in Buffalo Grove, Illinois. She had a younger brother, who died of pancreatic cancer at the age of two. Herrig began her career practicing kickboxing and Muay Thai before transitioning to MMA in 2009.
Herrig graduated from Buffalo Grove High School in 2003.

Kickboxing career

Prior to Felice "Lil' Bulldog" Herrig's move to mixed martial arts, Herrig held a professional kickboxing record of 23–5. She was ranked as high as number 2 in the World in the IKF International Kickboxing Federation Pro Women's Muay Thai Bantamweight Division.

As a pro kickboxer, Herrig won the International Kickboxing Federation Pro Muay Thai United States Bantamweight Title. She won the title on November 15, 2008, in Chicago, Illinois, US, when she defeated Katie Meehan by unanimous decision (49-46, 48–47, 49–46).

As an amateur, she was a two-time International Kickboxing Federation Open Tournament Champion.

On August 21, 2005, in Orlando, Florida, US, Herrig became the 2005 IKF North American Classic Amateur Full Contact Rules Bantamweight Tournament Champion when she defeated Terri French of Little Rock, Arkansas, US, by unanimous decision 30–27 on all 3 judges cards.

On July 30, 2006, in Cedar Rapids, Iowa, US, Herrig defended her IKF Tournament Title at the 2006 IKF World Classic when she defeated Stacy Chung of Thunder Bay, Ontario, Canada by unanimous decision 29–28 on all 3 judges cards.

She has also competed in the World Combat League with the St. Louis Enforcers.

Mixed martial arts career

Herrig appeared on Fight Girls in 2007 on the Oxygen and won her fight in Thailand against a champion Thai fighter. She was later scheduled to appear on another reality show about women's MMA called the Ultimate Women Challenge.

Herrig faced Iman Achhal at UWC: Man "O" War on February 21, 2009, in her MMA debut. She lost the fight by split decision.

She faced Michele Gutierrez at Unconquered 1: November Reign on November 20, 2009, and won the fight by armbar submission in the second round.

Herrig faced Jessica Rakoczy at Bellator 14 on April 15, 2010. She won the fight via split decision.

Herrig faced Amanda LaVoy at XFO 37 on December 4, 2010. She won the fight via armbar submission in the first round.

On January 14, 2011, Herrig faced Barb Honchak at Hoosier Fight Club 6: New Years Nemesis in Valparaiso, Indiana. She lost the fight via unanimous decision.

Herrig faced Andrea Miller at Chicago Cagefighting Championship 3 on March 5, 2011. She won the fight by TKO in the first round.

Herrig faced Nicdali Rivera-Calanoc at XFO 39 on May 13, 2011, at the Sears Centre in Hoffman Estates, Illinois. She won the fight via unanimous decision.

Her scheduled bout against undefeated Kelly Warren at Fight Tour on August 20, 2011, was cancelled due to Warren weighing in 7 pounds overweight.

Herrig faced Carla Esparza at XFC 15: Tribute on December 2, 2011, in Tampa, Florida. She was defeated by unanimous decision.

On April 13, 2012, Herrig faced Patricia Vidonic at XFC 17: Apocalypse in Jackson, Tennessee. She defeated Vidonic by unanimous decision.

Herrig next faced Simona Soukupova at XFC 19: Charlotte Showdown on August 3, 2012. She defeated Soukupova by unanimous decision.

Herrig was scheduled to return to Bellator to face Michele Gutierrez in a rematch at Bellator 84 on December 14, 2012. However, Gutierrez withdrew from the fight on December 1 and Herrig instead competed in a rematch against Patricia Vidonic. She won the fight via unanimous decision.

Herrig next competed against Heather Clark at Bellator 94 on March 28, 2013. She won the fight via split decision. The fight ended controversially as following the final bell Herrig unleashed a yell of celebration in her opponent's face, which prompted a post-fight backhand punch from Clark. Herrig retaliated with a punch of her own, before order was restored.

Invicta Fighting Championships
On August 13, 2013, it was announced that Herrig had signed a multi-fight deal with Invicta Fighting Championships. She faced Tecia Torres at Invicta FC 7: Honchak vs. Smith on December 7, 2013 and lost the fight via unanimous decision.

The Ultimate Fighter 20
On December 11, 2013, it was announced that Herrig was signed by the UFC along with ten other strawweight fighters to compete on season 20 of The Ultimate Fighter, which will crown the first ever UFC women's strawweight champion.

Herrig was the sixth fighter to go to coach Anthony Pettis.  She faced rival Heather Jo Clark in a rematch in the preliminary round of the tournament.  Herrig again won the fight by unanimous decision.  She lost to Randa Markos via submission in the quarterfinal round of competition.

Ultimate Fighting Championship
Herrig's first fight after The Ultimate Fighter was against Lisa Ellis at The Ultimate Fighter: A Champion Will Be Crowned Finale on December 12, 2014. She won the fight via submission in the second round.

Herrig faced Paige VanZant on April 18, 2015, at UFC on Fox 15. She lost the fight by unanimous decision.

Herrig next faced Kailin Curran at UFC on Fox 20 on July 23, 2016. She won the fight by rear naked choke just two minutes into the first round.

Herrig next faced Alexa Grasso on February 4, 2017, at UFC Fight Night 104. She won the fight by unanimous decision.

Herrig faced Justine Kish on June 25, 2017, at UFC Fight Night: Chiesa vs. Lee. She won the fight by unanimous decision.

Herrig faced Cortney Casey on December 2, 2017, at UFC 218. She won the fight via split decision.

Herrig faced Karolina Kowalkiewicz on April 7, 2018, at UFC 223. She lost the fight by split decision.

Herrig next faced Michelle Waterson on October 6, 2018, at UFC 229. She lost the fight via unanimous decision 

Herrig was expected to face Xiaonan Yan on June 8, 2019, at UFC 238. However, on April 30, 2019, it was reported that Herrig suffered from a torn ACL and was pulled from the event.

Herrig faced Virna Jandiroba on August 15, 2020, at UFC 252. She lost the fight via an armbar submission in the first round.

After a two-year hiatus, Herrig faced Karolina Kowalkiewicz on June 4, 2022, at UFC Fight Night 207. Herrig lost the bout via rear-naked choke in the second round, retiring after the bout. She retired from competing in MMA after the loss.

Mixed martial arts record

|-
|Loss
|align=center|14–10
|Karolina Kowalkiewicz
|Submission (rear-naked choke)
|UFC Fight Night: Volkov vs. Rozenstruik
|
|align=center|2
|align=center|4:01
|Las Vegas, Nevada, United States
|
|-
|Loss
|align=center|14–9
|Virna Jandiroba
|Submission (armbar)
|UFC 252
|
|align=center|1
|align=center|1:44
|Las Vegas, Nevada, United States
|
|-
|Loss
|align=center|14–8
|Michelle Waterson
|Decision (unanimous)
|UFC 229 
|
|align=center|3
|align=center|5:00
|Las Vegas, Nevada, United States
|
|- 
|Loss
|align=center|14–7
|Karolina Kowalkiewicz
|Decision (split)
|UFC 223
|
|align=center|3
|align=center|5:00
|Brooklyn, New York, United States
|
|-
|Win
|align=center|14–6
|Cortney Casey
|Decision (split)
|UFC 218 
|
|align=center|3
|align=center|5:00
|Detroit, Michigan, United States
|
|-
|Win
|align=center|13–6
|Justine Kish
|Decision (unanimous)
|UFC Fight Night: Chiesa vs. Lee
|
|align=center|3
|align=center|5:00
|Oklahoma City, Oklahoma, United States
|
|-
|Win
|align=center|12–6
|Alexa Grasso
|Decision (unanimous)
|UFC Fight Night: Bermudez vs. Korean Zombie 
|
|align=center|3
|align=center|5:00
|Houston, Texas, United States
|
|-
|Win
|align=center|11–6
|Kailin Curran
|Submission (rear-naked choke)
|UFC on Fox: Holm vs. Shevchenko 
|
|align=center|1
|align=center|1:59
|Chicago, Illinois, United States
|
|-
|Loss
|align=center|10–6
|Paige VanZant
|Decision (unanimous)
|UFC on Fox: Machida vs. Rockhold 
|
|align=center|3
|align=center|5:00
|Newark, New Jersey, United States
|
|-
|Win
|align=center|10–5
|Lisa Ellis
|Submission (armbar)
|The Ultimate Fighter: A Champion Will Be Crowned Finale
|
|align=center|2
|align=center|3:05
|Las Vegas, Nevada, United States
|
|-
| Loss
|align=center| 9–5
| Tecia Torres
| Decision (unanimous)
| Invicta FC 7: Honchak vs. Smith
| 
|align=center|3
|align=center|5:00
| Kansas City, Missouri, United States
|
|-
| Win
|align=center| 9–4
| Heather Jo Clark
| Decision (split)
| Bellator 94
| 
|align=center|3
|align=center|5:00
| Tampa, Florida, United States
|
|-
| Win
|align=center| 8–4
| Patricia Vidonic
| Decision (unanimous)
| Bellator 84
| 
|align=center| 3
|align=center| 5:00
| Hammond, Indiana, United States
|
|-
| Win
|align=center| 7–4
| Simona Soukupova
| Decision (unanimous)
| XFC 19: Charlotte Showdown
| 
|align=center| 3
|align=center| 5:00
| Charlotte, North Carolina, United States
|
|-
| Win
|align=center| 6–4
| Patricia Vidonic
| Decision (unanimous)
| XFC 17: Apocalypse
| 
|align=center| 3
|align=center| 5:00
| Jackson, Tennessee, United States
| 
|-
| Loss
|align=center| 5–4
| Carla Esparza
| Decision (unanimous)
| XFC 15: Tribute
| 
|align=center| 3
|align=center| 5:00
| Tampa, Florida, United States
| 
|-
| Win
|align=center| 5–3
| Nicdali Rivera-Calanoc
| Decision (unanimous)
| Xtreme Fighting Organization 39
| 
|align=center| 3
|align=center| 5:00
| Hoffman Estates, Illinois, United States
| 
|-
| Win
|align=center| 4–3
| Andrea Miller
| TKO (punches)
| Chicago Cagefighting Championship 3
| 
|align=center| 1
|align=center| 3:30
| Villa Park, Illinois, United States
|
|-
| Loss
|align=center| 3–3
| Barb Honchak
| Decision (unanimous)
| Hoosier Fight Club 6: New Years Nemesis
| 
|align=center| 3
|align=center| 5:00
| Valparaiso, Indiana, United States
|
|-
| Win
|align=center| 3–2
| Amanda LaVoy
| Submission (armbar)
| Xtreme Fighting Organization 37
| 
|align=center| 1
|align=center| 3:35
| Chicago, Illinois, United States
|
|-
| Win
|align=center| 2–2
| Jessica Rakoczy
| Decision (split)
| Bellator 14
| 
|align=center| 3
|align=center| 5:00
| Chicago, Illinois, United States
|
|-
| Win
|align=center| 1–2
| Michele Gutierrez
| Submission (armbar) 
| Unconquered 1: November Reign 
| 
|align=center| 2
|align=center| 2:03
| Coral Gables, Florida, United States
|
|-
| Loss
|align=center| 0–2
| Valerie Coolbaugh
| Decision (split) 
| Xtreme Fighting Organization 29
| 
|align=center| 3
|align=center| 5:00
| Lakemoor, Illinois, United States
|
|-
| Loss
|align=center| 0–1
| Iman Achhal
| Decision (split) 
| UWC: Man "O" War
| 
|align=center| 3
|align=center| 5:00
| Fairfax, Virginia, United States
|

Mixed martial arts exhibition record

|-
|Loss
|align=center|1–1
| Randa Markos
| Submission (scarf-hold armlock)
| rowspan=2| The Ultimate Fighter: A Champion Will Be Crowned
| (airdate)
|align=center|1
|align=center|2:46 
| rowspan=2|Las Vegas, Nevada, United States
|
|-
|Win
|align=center|1–0
| Heather Jo Clark
| Decision (unanimous) 
| (airdate)
|align=center|2
|align=center|5:00
|
|-

Kickboxing record (Incomplete)

|-
|-  bgcolor="#CCFFCC"
| 2009-06-16 || Win ||align=left| Emily Bearden || Muay Thai Mayhem 14 || New York City, New York, US || Decision (majority) || 3 || 3:00 
|-
|-  bgcolor="#CCFFCC"
| 2008-11-15 || Win ||align=left| Katie Meehan || N/A || Chicago, Illinois, US || Decision (unanimous) || 5 || 3:00  
|-
|-  bgcolor="#CCFFCC"
| 2005-03-18 || Win ||align=left| Liz McKay || Border Wars || Crystal Lake, Illinois, US || Decision (split) || 3 || 3:00 
|-
|-
| colspan=9 | Legend:

Media appearances
Herrig is a playable character in the 2011 video game Supremacy MMA for Xbox 360 and PlayStation 3.
She also appeared in American Ninja Warrior in 2015, and again in 2016, but did not complete the initial courses.

See also
 List of female mixed martial artists

References

External links
 
 

1984 births
Living people
American female kickboxers
Kickboxers from Illinois
American female mixed martial artists
Mixed martial artists from Illinois
American Muay Thai practitioners
Female Muay Thai practitioners
Strawweight mixed martial artists
Mixed martial artists utilizing Muay Thai
Mixed martial artists utilizing Brazilian jiu-jitsu
American practitioners of Brazilian jiu-jitsu
Female Brazilian jiu-jitsu practitioners
People from Buffalo Grove, Illinois
Ultimate Fighting Championship female fighters
21st-century American women